Paul Germann is a Canadian sound effects editor, who was a winner of the Canadian Screen Award for Best Sound Editing at the 10th Canadian Screen Awards in 2022 for Scarborough.

He was nominated in the category on five prior occasions, receiving nods at the 16th Genie Awards in 1996 for The Michelle Apartments, the 30th Genie Awards in 2009 for Nurse.Fighter.Boy, the 8th Canadian Screen Awards in 2020 for both Disappearance at Clifton Hill and Goalie, and the 9th Canadian Screen Awards in 2021 for The Nest.

References

External links

Canadian sound editors
Best Sound Editing Genie and Canadian Screen Award winners
Living people
Year of birth missing (living people)